
 

Racecourse Bay is a locality in the Australian state of South Australia located on the state’s south-east coast overlooking the body of water known in Australia as the Southern Ocean and by international authorities as the Great Australian Bight.

Racecourse Bay consists of land formerly used as a shack site known as The Racecourse which made part of the locality of Port MacDonnell in 1996.  The locality came in existence in 1999 when boundaries were created for land formerly part of the locality of Port MacDonnell.  Its name which is reported as being a ‘long established name’ was derived from the bay which it overlooks.

The locality consists of land between the coastline and a road known as Eight Mile Creek Road which runs from the town centre of Port MacDonnell in the west to the boundary between the localities of Eight Mile Creek and Wye in the east.  The land use within the locality consists of residential use and conservation.

The 2016 Australian census which was conducted in August 2016 reports that Racecoourse Bay had a population of 33 people.

Racecourse Bay is located within the federal division of Barker, the state electoral district of Mount Gambier and the local government area of the District Council of Grant.

References

Towns in South Australia
Limestone Coast